The benedictive mood is a grammatical mood found in Sanskrit, although rarely. It expresses a blessing or wish, such as found in the English expressions "long live the king" and "may the force be with you". For verbs in the active voice (parasmaipada), it is formed by adding endings very similar to the athematic optative endings directly to the verb root itself. Essentially, the sibilant -s is inserted between the optative marker -yā and the personal endings. By the action of the rules of sandhi, the second- and third-person benedictive endings are identical to the corresponding optative endings (-yāst turns into -yāt for the third person, and -yāss into yās for the second person).

Middle voice (ātmanepada) benedictives are not found in Classical Sanskrit.

For example, the verb root bhū forms the benedictive thus:

Bibliography
 Devavāṇīpraveśikā: An Introduction to the Sanskrit Language – Robert P. Goldman – 
 A Sanskrit Grammar for Students – A. A. Macdonell – 

Grammatical moods
Sanskrit grammar